The 2015–16 season was Újpest FC's 110th competitive season, 104rd consecutive season in the OTP Bank Liga and 130th year in existence as a football club.

First Team Squad

Transfers

In

Summer

Winter

Out

Summer

Winter

Loan In

Summer

Winter

Loan Out

Winter

Statistics

Appearances and goals

Top scorers
Includes all competitive matches. The list is sorted by shirt number when total goals are equal.

Last updated on 1 May 2016

Overall
{|class="wikitable"
|-
|Games played || 43 (33 OTP Bank Liga, 10 Hungarian Cup)
|-
|Games won || 18 (11 OTP Bank Liga, 7 Hungarian Cup)
|-
|Games drawn || 15 (13 OTP Bank Liga, 2 Hungarian Cup)
|-
|Games lost || 10 (9 OTP Bank Liga, 1 Hungarian Cup)
|-
|Goals scored || 88
|-
|Goals conceded || 42
|-
|Goal difference || +46
|-
|Yellow cards || 70
|-
|Red cards || 4
|-
|rowspan="1"|Worst discipline ||  Jonathan Heris (8 , 1 )
|-
|rowspan="1"|Best result || 14–1 (A) v Vértessomlói KSK – Hungarian Cup – 12-08-2015
|-
|rowspan="2"|Worst result || 0–3 (A) v Videoton – OTP Bank Liga – 19-09-2015
|-
| 0–3 (H) v Videoton – OTP Bank Liga – 30-04-2016
|-
|rowspan="1"|Most appearances ||  Balázs Balogh (38 appearances)
|-
|rowspan="1"|Top scorers || |  Enis Bardhi (16 goals)
|-
|Points || 46/99 (46.4%)
|-

Friendlies

Pre-season

Mid-season

Nemzeti bajnokság I

Matches

League table

Results by round

Results summary

Hungarian Cup

References 

Újpest FC seasons
Ujpest